Marcelo Rubens Paiva (born 1959, in São Paulo) is a Brazilian writer born in São Paulo, Brazil. He is the son of Rubens Paiva, who disappeared during Brazil's military dictatorship in 1971.

When jumping off a waterfall, Paiva fractured his spine and became tetraplegic. In 1983, after extensive physiotherapy, he gained the movement of both arms and hands and wrote Feliz Ano Velho (Happy Old Year), an autobiographical recollection of these events and his entire life.

Marcelo Rubens Paiva is a writer, screenwriter and playwright. He graduated in Communication Radio & TV (USP; 1982–87), drama course (Centro de Pesquisas Teatrais do Sesc-SP; 1989–90), master in Literature (Unicamp; 1991–94) and the Knight Fellowship Program (Stanford University, CA; 1995–96).

He wrote for TV. Teleplay with Fernando Meirelles (Olho Mágico, 1987), TV Cultura (Leitura Livre, 1984, Fanzine, 1992–94), Rede Globo (Vida ao Vivo - Fantástico, 2000, and Sexo Frágil, 2003–04),  BandTV with Mauro Lima (Aventuras de Tiazinha), Multishow GloboSat (Segunda Vez, 2014, and E Aí, Comeu?, 2016). Writer's room for Conspiração (Contravenção, 2018–19) and Feliz Ano Velho (MaFilmes, 2019). Was Emmy nominated for the teleplay of O Homem Mais Forte do Mundo (TV Globo, 2018).

He has written films such as Bicho de 7 Cabeças (1999), Malu de Bicicleta (2010), E Aí, Comeu? (2012), Depois de Tudo (2015), Mais Forte que o Mundo (2016), and the docs Fiel e Polanski no Brasil. Four times nominated as best screenwriter by Academia Brasileira de Cinema. Won the ABL prize for the script of Malu de Bicicleta. Wrote the srerenplay of Casagrande e Seus Demônios (Globo e Paris Filmes), Código 12 (Barretos) and The Book (Tambellini Filme).

Marcelo Rubens Paiva has also written Feliz Ano Velho (1982, Prêmio Jabuti), Blecaute (1986), Ua:brari (1990), Bala na Agulha (1992), Não És Tu, Brasil (1996), Malu de Bicicleta (2003), A Segunda Vez Que Te Conheci (2009), Orangotango Marxista (2016) by Companhia das Das Letras, As Fêmeas (1994), O Homem Que Conhecia as Mulheres (2006) and As Verdades Que Ela Não Diz (2012), Ainda Estou Aqui (prêmio Jabuti 2015), Meninos em Fúria (2016), Menino e o Foguete (Jabuti de 2017). Was translated in to English, Spanish, French, Italian, German and Czech.

And theater plays: 525 Linhas (1989), E Aí, Comeu? (1999, Prêmo Shell), Mais-Que-Imperfeito (2000), As Mentiras que os Homens Contam (2001), Closet Show (2001), No Retrovisor (2002), Amo-te (2006), A Noite Mais Fria do Ano (2009), O Predador Entra Na Sala (2010).

For the press, since 1983 he has written columns for newspapers and magazines such as Veja, Folha de S. Paulo, Vogue RG, O Estado de São Paulo, Miami Herald, San Francisco Chronicle, New York Times.

Since 2003, he has written a column for the Brazilian newspaper Estadão.

BOOKS

Feliz Ano Velho (1982)
Blecaute (1986)
Ua brari (1990)
Bala na Agulha (1992)
As Fêmeas (1994)
Não És Tu, Brasil (1996)
Malu de Bicicleta (2002)
O Homem que Conhecia as Mulheres (2006)
A Segunda Vez que Te Conheci (2008)
Marcelo Rubens Paiva - Crônicas para ler na escola (2011)
E Aí, Comeu? (2012)
As Verdades Que Ela Não Diz (2012)
1 drible, 2 dribles, 3 dribles: manual do pequeno craque cidadão (2014)
Ainda Estou Aqui (2015)
Meninos em Fúria (2016)
O Orangotango Marxista (2018)
O Homem Ridículo (2019)

FILMS

Fiel (2012)
E Aí, Comeu? (2012)
Malu de Bicicleta (2013)
Depois de Tudo (2015)
Mais Forte que o Mundo (2016)
Código 12 (2017)
O Book (2018)
Casagrande e Seus Demônios (2019)

THEATER

525 Linhas (1989)[10]
E Aí, Comeu? (Da Boca pra Fora) (1998)
Mais-que-Imperfeito (2001)
Closet Show (2003)
As Mentiras que os Homens Contam (2003)
No Retrovisor (2003)
Amo-te (2006)
A Noite Mais Fria do Ano (2011)
O Predador Entra na Sala (2012)
C'est La Vie (2014)
Amores Urbanos (2016)

External links
Editora Objetiva | Marcelo Rubens Paiva

1959 births
Brazilian columnists
Living people
Writers from São Paulo
People with paraplegia